John Clifford Johnson (September 29, 1914 – June 26, 1991) was a middle-relief pitcher in Major League Baseball who played for the New York Yankees (1944) and Chicago White Sox (1945). He was born in Belmore, Ohio.

In a two-season career, Johnson posted a 3–2 record with 49 strikeouts and a 4.20 ERA in 51 appearances, including one start, seven saves, 27 games finished, and 96 ⅓ innings.

Johnson died in Iron Mountain, Michigan, at the age of 76.

See also
Chicago White Sox all-time roster

Sources

Retrosheet

1914 births
1991 deaths
People from Putnam County, Ohio
New York Yankees players
Chicago White Sox players
Major League Baseball pitchers
Baseball players from Ohio
Eastern Michigan Eagles baseball players
Augusta Tigers players
Beaumont Exporters players
Burials in Michigan
Charleroi Tigers players
Kansas City Blues (baseball) players
Newark Bears (IL) players
Rocky Mount Rocks players
Toledo Mud Hens players